In the mathematical field of differential geometry, the fundamental theorem of surface theory deals with the problem of prescribing the geometric data of a submanifold of Euclidean space. Originally proved by Pierre Ossian Bonnet in 1867, it has since been extended to higher dimensions and non-Euclidean contexts.

Bonnet's theorem
Any surface in three-dimensional Euclidean space has a first and second fundamental form, which automatically are interrelated by the Gauss–Codazzi equations. Bonnet's theorem asserts a local converse to this result.

If these are smooth and satisfy the Gauss–Codazzi equations, then Bonnet's theorem says that  is covered by open sets which can be smoothly embedded into  with first fundamental form  and second fundamental form (relative to one of the two choices of unit normal vector field) .

Bonnet's theorem is a corollary of the Frobenius theorem, upon viewing the Gauss–Codazzi equations as a system of first-order partial differential equations for the two coordinate derivatives of the position vector of an embedding, together with the normal vector.

General formulations
Bonnet's theorem can be naturally formulated for hypersurfaces in a Euclidean space of any dimension, and the result remains true in this context. The idea of the proof is to use the existence theory from the local formulation to construct the immersion along arbitrary curves emanating from a single point. Simple-connectedness is used to say that any two such curves with a common endpoint are homotopic (through paths fixing the endpoints), and uniqueness from the local formulation implies that the value of the immersion at the endpoint must be fixed through the homotopy, so that an immersion results which is well-defined on the entire manifold.

In this global formulation, existence would not hold in general if the condition of simple-connectedness were removed. This can be seen from the nonexistence of a hypersurface immersion of the torus whose first fundamental form is flat and whose second fundamental form is zero.

The theorem can also be extended, beyond the context of hypersurfaces, to the theory of submanifolds of arbitrary codimension. This is more complicated to formulate, because in addition to the first and second fundamental forms, there is also the (generally nontrivial) connection in the normal bundle which must be taken into account. In this generality, the fundamental theorem of surface theory subsumes the fundamental theorem of curves.

In this general context, the ambient Euclidean space can also be replaced by any connected and geodesically complete Riemannian manifold of constant curvature, which (as with the more special case of higher codimension) requires a suitably extended formulation of the Gauss–Codazzi equations.

References

Bibliography

Surfaces
Theorems in differential geometry